Csilla Tatár (born 27 May 1983) is a Hungarian reporter and presenter.

Life
Tatár made her first appearance in 1996, at the age of 13, when she recited a poem on Duna TV. Since 2002, she has been a reporter and editor. In 2009, she graduated from the Budapest Metropolitan University College of Communication and Business.

She worked for 12 years as a presenter on TV2, but since December 2014, she works at MTVA. Here, she became the host of A Dal.

On 23 May 2015, she presented Hungary's points for the Eurovision Song Contest 2015. She eventually replaced Éva Novodomszky as the presenter of Hungary's points for Eurovision.

Filmography

TV2 Group
 Aktív (2002–2011) Editor and reporter
 Magellán (2002–2006) Editor and reporter
 Favorit (2007) Editor and reporter
 Kölykök (2007) line-producer
 Macsólabor (2009) Presenter
 Megamánia (2010) Editor and presenter
 MegaBackstage (2012) Presenter
 A Szépségkirálynő (2012, 2013) Presenter
 Mokka (2011–2014) Presenter

Duna Média
 A Dal (2015) – presenter, with Levente Harsányi (M1, Duna World)
 Én vagyok itt! (2015) – presenter (M2 Petőfi)
 Böngésző (2015) – presenter (M2 Petőfi)
 Eurovision Song Contest (2015, 2016, 2017) – presenter, spokeswoman of the Hungarian vote (Duna)
 Miss World Hungary – Magyarország szépe (2015) – presenter, with Levente Harsányi (Duna)
 A Dal (2016) – presenter, with Levente Harsányi (Duna, Duna World)
 Magyarország, szeretlek! (2016) – team captain (Duna)
 Miss World Hungary – Magyarország szépe (2016) – presenter, Levente Harsányi (Duna)
 47. Debreceni virágkarnevál (2016) – presenter, with Vajk Szente (Duna World)
 A Dal (2017) – presenter, with Levente Harsányi (Duna, Duna World)

Awards
 Presenter of the year (Glamour Women of the Year, 2012)
 Fittest presenter of the year (Fitbalance Award, 2014)

References

External links
 
 
 Sztárlexikon
 Tatár Csilla diplomás lett
 Műsorvezető adatbázis
 Műsorvezetők

1983 births
Living people
Television people from Budapest
Hungarian television presenters
21st-century Hungarian women
Hungarian women television presenters